Cappella may refer to:

 Cappella (band), Italian electronic music group
 a cappella, unaccompanied singing

People with the surname

 Felix Cappella (1930-2011), Canadian race walker
 Scipione Cappella (fl. 18th century), Italian painter

See also 
 A cappella (disambiguation), including "A Cappella"
 Capella (disambiguation)
 Capela (disambiguation)